Sir Robert Bindlosse, 1st Baronet (1624 – 6 November 1688) was an English politician who sat in the House of Commons at various times between 1646 and 1660.

Bindlosse was the son of Sir Francis Bindlosse (died 1629) of Borwick Hall, Lancashire, and was baptised on 8 May 1624. He succeeded his grandfather in 1630, inheriting Borwick Hall, Lancaster. He matriculated from Trinity College, Cambridge, in 1640. He was created a baronet, of Borwick Hall in the County of Lancaster, on 16 June 1641.

In 1646, Bindlosse was elected Member of Parliament for Lancaster  in the Long Parliament. He was probably secluded or chose not to sit after Pride's Purge in 1648.  He was High Sheriff of Lancashire in 1658.

In 1660, Bindlosse was elected MP for Lancashire in the Convention Parliament. He was High Sheriff of Lancashire again in 1672 and 1673.
 
He died at the age of 64 and was buried on 15 November 1688 at Warton. He had no male issue and the baronetcy became extinct. He was succeeded by his daughter Cecilia, who married William Standish of Standish, Wigan; the Borwick estate passed to her.

References

 

1624 births
1688 deaths
High Sheriffs of Lancashire
Baronets in the Baronetage of England
Members of the Parliament of England (pre-1707) for Lancashire
Alumni of Trinity College, Cambridge
English MPs 1640–1648
English MPs 1660
Mayors of Lancaster, Lancashire